Chkalovsk may refer to:
Chkalovsk, Russia, a town in Chkalovsky District of Nizhny Novgorod Oblast, Russia
Chkalovsk Urban Okrug, a municipal formation into which the town of oblast significance of Chkalovsk in Nizhny Novgorod Oblast, Russia is incorporated
Chkalovsk Urban Settlement, a former municipal formation into which the former town of district significance of Chkalovsk in former Chkalovsky District of Nizhny Novgorod Oblast, Russia was incorporated
Chkalovsk, former name of Buston, a town in Sughd Province, Tajikistan
Chkalovsk Microdistrict, a part of the city of Kaliningrad, Russia
Kaliningrad Chkalovsk, a naval air base in Kaliningrad Oblast, Russia
Omsk Chkalovsk, an airport in Omsk, Russia

See also
Chkalov (disambiguation)
Chkalovsky (disambiguation)